The Truth About Women is a lost 1924 American silent film drama directed by Burton King and starring Hope Hampton and Lowell Sherman.

Cast
Hope Hampton - Hilda Carr
Lowell Sherman - Warren Carr
David Powell - Howard Bronson
Mary Thurman - Nona Boyd
Dainty Lee - Blossom Carr
Louise Carter - Bronson's mother
Charles Craig - Smead
Rosella Ray - Molly
Warren Cook - Jack
Charles Edwards - Fred
Augusta Carey - Florence

References

External links

1924 films
American silent feature films
Lost American films
Films directed by Burton L. King
American black-and-white films
Silent American drama films
1924 drama films
1924 lost films
Lost drama films
1920s American films